Hornby may refer to:

Places

In England 
 Hornby, Lancashire
 Hornby, Hambleton, village in North Yorkshire
 Hornby, Richmondshire, village in North Yorkshire

Elsewhere 
 Hornby, Ontario, community in the town of Halton Hills, Ontario, Canada
 Hornby Island, island in British Columbia, Canada 
 Hornby, New York, town 
 Hornby, New Zealand, suburb of Christchurch

Other
 Hornby (surname)
 Hornby Railways, popular British brand of model railway
 SS Hornby, a 1908 tug tender

See also 
 Hornby Castle (disambiguation)
 Hornby Dock, dock in Liverpool, England
 Hornby Lighthouse, in New South Wales, Australia 
 Hornby Priory, former monastery in Hornby, Lancashire, England
 Hornby School, historic school house in Pennsylvania
 Hornby High School, Christchurch, New Zealand
 Hornsby (disambiguation)